Mohamed Islam Belkhir (born 16 March 2001 in Oran) is an Algerian footballer who plays for CR Belouizdad in the Algerian Ligue Professionnelle 1 and the Algeria U23.

International career
On 29 August 2021 Belkhir made his Algeria A' national team debut, starting and scoring in a 3-0 win over Burundi.

References

External links
 

2001 births
Algeria under-23 international footballers
Algeria youth international footballers
Algerian footballers
Living people
People from Oran
Algerian Ligue Professionnelle 1 players
Association football wingers
21st-century Algerian people
CR Belouizdad players
MC Oran players
Algeria A' international footballers
2022 African Nations Championship players